Lucretia Harris, also known as Lucretia Williams and Lucretia B. H. Rogers, (1873 or 1874 - July 27, 1923) was an actress in the United States. An African American, she had supporting roles during the silent film era. She featured in The Adventures and Emotions of Edgar Pomeroy series of comedy shorts from 1920 until 1921.

Her roles included portraying a mammy in multiple films, a cook, and a maid in the Edgar series.

She was from Alabama. She is buried in the Angelus-Rosedale Cemetery in Los Angeles.

Filmography
A Kentucky Cinderella (1917) as Aunt Chlorindy
The Captain of His Soul (1918)
The Last Rebel (1918 film)
Creaking Stairs (1919)
The Feud (1919 film) as Nancy
The Intrusion of Isabel (1919) as Mammy Johnson
Edgar and the Teacher's Pet (1920)*short
Edgar's Hamlet (1920)*short
Edgar's Jonah Day (1920)*short
Edgar Takes the Cake (1920)*short
Edgar's Sunday Courtship (1920)*short
Edgar Camps Out (1920)*short
Edgar's Little Saw (1920)*short
Edgar, the Explorer (1920)*short
Edgar's Country Cousin (1921)*short
Edgar's Feast Day (1921)*short
Desperate Youth (1921)
Edgar, the Detective (1921) *short
Nobody's Fool (1921 film) as Melinda 
The Forgotten Law (1922) as Mammy Cely 
Human Hearts (1922) as Carolina

References

1870s births
1923 deaths
Actresses from Alabama
American film actresses
American silent film actresses
20th-century American actresses
African-American actresses
20th-century African-American women
20th-century African-American people